Saint Emmeram's Abbey ( or Reichsabtei Sankt Emmeram), now known as Schloss Thurn und Taxis, Schloss St. Emmeram or St. Emmeram's Basilica, was a Benedictine monastery founded in about 739 at Regensburg in Bavaria (modern-day southeastern Germany) at the grave of the itinerant Frankish bishop Saint Emmeram.

History
When the monastery was founded in about 739, the bishops of Regensburg were abbots in commendam, a common practice at the time which was not always to the advantage of the abbeys concerned. In 975, Saint Wolfgang of Regensburg, then bishop of Regensburg and abbot of St. Emmeram's, voluntarily gave up the position of abbot and severed the connection, making the abbots of St. Emmeram's independent of the bishopric. He was one of the first German bishops to do this, and his example in this was much copied across Germany in the years following. The first independent abbot was Ramwold (later the Blessed Ramwold). Both he and Saint Wolfgang were advocates of the monastic reforms of Gorze.

Saint Wolfgang, who was made bishop in 972, ordered that a library be constructed at St. Emmeram shortly after his arrival in Regensburg. An active scriptorium had existed at St. Emmeram in the Carolingian period, but it is not known whether it occupied a special building, and it appears that relatively few manuscripts, of poor quality, were produced there during the early tenth century. Over time, some works in the scriptorium were copied by monks, some works were preserved from the Carolingian period, and others were acquired as gifts. The library became well supplied with works by early Christian writers such as Saint Augustine, as well as by ancient writers such as Virgil and Seneca. In addition to works that had an overt religious or inspirational purpose, the library held a large collection of manuscripts used in the monastery school, focusing on subjects such as logic, arithmetic, rhetoric, grammar, and even astronomy and music. By the early eleventh century, the library at St. Emmeram had acquired a reputation for its collection. Neighboring libraries began requesting to borrow books for copying. An eleventh-century librarian at the monastery, Froumund of Tegernsee, referred to the book room as a bibliotheca, a term implying an extensive manuscript collection. The scriptorium of St. Emmeram's in the Early Middle Ages became a significant centre of book production and illumination, the home of works such as the sacramentary of Emperor Henry II (produced between 1002 and 1014) and the Uta Codex (shortly after 1002).

In 1295 the counter-king Adolf of Nassau granted the abbey the regalia and made it reichsunmittelbar (i.e., an Imperial abbey, an independent sovereign power subject directly to the emperor).

After a decline in its significance during the 16th century the abbey enjoyed a resurgence in the 17th and 18th centuries under abbots Frobenius Forster, Coelestin Steiglehner, Roman Zirngibl and Placidus Heinrich, great scholars, particularly in the natural sciences. Under their leadership the abbey academy came to rival the Münchner Akademie. St. Emmeram's had a long tradition of scientific enquiry dating from the Middle Ages, in witness of which the monastery preserved the astrolabe of William of Hirsau.

In 1731, the abbots were raised to the status of Princes of the Empire (Reichsfürsten). Between 1731 and 1733 there followed the magnificent Baroque refurbishment, by the Asam brothers, of the abbey church, which had been repeatedly burnt out and repaired.

In 1803, St. Emmeram's, along with the Imperial City of Regensburg, the Bishopric of Regensburg and the two other Imperial Abbeys (Niedermünster and Obermünster), lost its previous politically independent status to the newly formed Principality of Regensburg, often referred to as the Archbishopric of Regensburg, under the former Prince-Primate Carl Theodor von Dalberg. In 1803 he donated a large garden at the abbey to the Royal Bavarian Botanical Society of Regensburg for construction of a botanic garden that was maintained until 1855. After the Treaty of Paris of 1810, the entire Principality of Regensburg was transferred to Bavaria.

The treasures of St. Emmeram's (for example, the ciborium of Arnulf, now in the Residenz) and its valuable library (including Muspilli, the Codex Aureus of St. Emmeram, and Dialogus de laudibus sanctae crucis) were mostly removed to Munich.

Schloss Thurn und Taxis 
In 1812 the monastic buildings were granted to the Princes of Thurn und Taxis, who had St. Emmeram's Abbey converted as a residence known from then on as Schloss Thurn und Taxis, sometimes called Schloss Sankt Emmeram. St. Emmeram Palace (or Abbey) is the largest private residence in Germany, with 517 rooms and a floor area of 21,460 m2 (231,000 sq. ft). 
The St. Emmeram Palace with its park in Regensburg's city center covers five hectares. The Thurn und Taxis princely family still uses the palace as its primary residence.

St. Emmeram's Basilica 

The abbey church became a parish church, to which, on 18 February 1964, Pope Paul VI accorded the status of a basilica minor. The Romanesque basilica with three aisles, three choirs and a west transept is based on an original church building from the second half of the 8th century. Since that time it has been many times partly destroyed and rebuilt. The oldest extant part of the building is the ring crypt under the choir of the northern aisle. The three medieval, carved stone reliefs on the north portal, dating from about 1052, the oldest of their type in Germany, represent Christ, Saint Emmeram and Saint Denis. The west transept has a painted wooden ceiling depicting Saint Benedict of Nursia. The crypt of Saint Wolfgang is beneath the choir of Saint Denis. Next to Saint Denis's altar in the northern aisle is the tomb of Emma, Queen of the East Franks (died 876), let into the wall. The high altar dates from 1669.

The tower has six bells.

Notable burials in St. Emmeram's 
 Saint Emmeram
 Saint Wolfgang
 Blessed Ramwold
 Emma, Queen of the East Franks (consort of Louis the German)
 Blessed Aurelia, anchorite
 The Blessed Bishops Wolflek, Gaubald and Tuto
 Arnulf of Carinthia, King of the East Franks and Holy Roman Emperor
 His son, King Louis the Child
 Arnulf the Wicked, Duke of Bavaria
 Relics of Saints Maximianus and Calcidonius
 Johannes Aventinus, historian of Bavaria
Engelberga, wife of Louis II, Holy Roman Emperor

St. Rupert's church 
St. Rupert's church was formerly the parish church of the monastery. The church, with two aisles, was constructed in the second half of the 11th century, but was frequently adapted and enlarged. The nave is from the 14th century, the choir from 1405, the high altar with four pillars and a picture of the baptism of Duke Theodo of Bavaria by Saint Rupert from 1690, and the decoration and fittings from the 17th and 18th centuries. The tabernacle on the north side of the choir has figures of Saint Rupert and other saints. The altar of Saint Michael dated from 1713. The nave is decorated with pictures of the miracles of Saint Rupert.

Abbots

Bishops of Regensburg (abbots ex officio) 
 Gaubald (739–761)
 Sigerich (762–768)
 Sintpert (768–791)
 Adalwin (792–816)
 Baturich (817–847)
 Erchanfrid (c. 847–864)
 Ambricho (c. 864–891)
 Aspert (891–894)
 Tuto (c. 894–930)
 Isangrim (930–941)
 Gunther (942)
 Michael (c. 942–972)
 Wolfgang (972–975)

Abbots

Prince-Abbots 
 Anselm Godin de Tampezo (1725–1742)
 Johann V Baptist Kraus (1742–1762)
 Frobenius Forster (1762–1791)
 Coelestin II Steiglehner (1791–1803; died 1819)

Notes

References 
 Kallmünz, 1992. St. Emmeram in Regensburg. Geschichte - Kunst - Denkmalpflege. Thurn und Taxis-Studien 18.
 Morsbach, P. (photos: A. Bunz), 1993: St. Emmeram zu Regensburg. Ehem. Benediktiner-Abteikirche. Großer Kunstführer Nr. 187. Schnell & Steiner: Regensburg.
 1803 – Die gelehrten Mönche und das Ende einer 1000-jährigen Tradition. Exhibition guide. Bischöfliches Ordinariat Regensburg: Regensburg, 2003.

External links 

 Schloss Thurn und Taxis in Regensburg
   Bischöfliches Ordinariat Regensburg
  Klöster in Bayern: Sankt Emmeram, Regensburg
  Kreutzgang des Kloster in National-Archiv für Deutschlands Kunst und Alterthum, Nürnberg 1828 (images)
  Virtual tour
 Kreutzgang des Klosters in National-Archiv für Deutschlands Kunst und Alterthum, Nürnberg 1828
 Privileg Karls des Großen für Kloster St. Emmeram, 22.2.794, 

Basilica churches in Germany
Bavarian Circle
Benedictine monasteries in Germany
Roman Catholic churches in Regensburg
Castles in Bavaria
Christian monasteries established in the 8th century
Thurn und Taxis residences
Imperial abbeys disestablished in 1802–03
Monasteries in Bavaria
Palaces in Bavaria
8th-century establishments in Germany
Burial sites of the House of Thurn und Taxis
Burial sites of the Carolingian dynasty
Burial sites of the Luitpoldings
Churches completed in 739
8th-century churches in Germany